Tusa is a comune (municipality) in the Province of Messina in the Italian region of Sicily, located about  east of Palermo and about  west of Messina.

Tusa borders the following municipalities: Motta d'Affermo, Pettineo, San Mauro Castelverde.

Demographic evolution

References

Cities and towns in Sicily